Greenpoint may refer to:

 Greenpoint, Brooklyn, United States
 Greenspoint, Houston, United States
 Greenpoint Avenue
 Greenpoint Avenue Bridge
 Greenpoint Avenue station

See also 

 Green Point (disambiguation)